Ashmaka or Assaka was a Mahajanapada in ancient India which existed between 700 BCE and 425 or 345 BCE according to the Buddhist texts Anguttara Nikaya and Puranas. It was located around and between the Godavari river in present-day Telangana and Maharashtra. Its capital is variously called Potali or Podana, and is identified as present-day Bodhan in Telangana.

Location 
Aśmaka was located on the Godāvarī river, between Mūlaka and Kaliṅga.

The capital of Aśmaka was the city variously named Podana, Potali, and Potana, which corresponds to modern-day Bodhan.

History

Aśmaka annexed the small kingdom of Mūlaka located to its west during the Mahajanapada period, after which it became the southern neighbour of the kingdom of Avanti.

The Hathigumpha inscription of Kharavela (2nd century BCE) mentions Kharavela's threat to a city variously interpreted as "Masika" (Masikanagara), "Musika" (Musikanagara) or "Asika" (Asikanagara). N. K. Sahu identifies Asika as the capital of Asmaka. According to Ajay Mitra Shastri, "Asika-nagara" was located in the present-day village of Adam in Nagpur district (on the Wainganga River). A terracotta seal excavated in the village mentions the Asmaka janapada. Asmaka also included Mulaka area around Paithan known in ancient times as Pratishthana. According to Sutta Nipata Saketa or Ayodhya was first halting place on the southward road (Dakshinapatha) from Shravasti to Pratishthana.

See also
Kingdoms of Ancient India
Mahajanapada
History of India
History of Maharashtra
Janapada

References

Sources

External links

Mahajanapadas